"Not Thinkin' Bout You" is a song recorded by Australian singer-songwriter Ruel. The song was released on 2 November 2018 as the fourth single from Ruel's debut extended play, Ready. A GoldLink remix and an acoustic version, featuring Billy Davis was later released.

Ruel says the song is about getting over a breakup and denial; saying you're not thinking about someone, when you obviously are.

Music video
The music video for "Not Thinkin' Bout You" was directed by Grey Ghost and released on 30 October 2018. The clip was filmed whilst on tour between the locations of Seoul, Tokyo and Los Angeles and shows Ruel amongst fans, in photoshoots and exploring the streets.

Track listing
Radio
"Not Thinkin' Bout You" – 3:08

Digital download – Remix
 "Not Thinkin' Bout You" (Remix) (featuring GoldLink)  – 3:50

Digital download – Acoustic version
 "Not Thinkin' Bout You" (featuring Billy Davis) - Acoustic Version  – 4:54

Certifications

Release history

References
 

2018 singles
2018 songs
Ruel (singer) songs
RCA Records singles
Songs written by Symbolyc One
Songs written by M-Phazes
Songs written by Ruel (singer)
Songs written by Romans (musician)
Songs written by Tobias Jesso Jr.